The U.S. state of Washington first required its residents to register their motor vehicles in 1905. Registrants provided their own license plates for display until 1915, when the state began to issue plates.

, plates are issued by the Washington State Department of Licensing. Front and rear plates are required for most classes of vehicles, while only rear plates are required for motorcycles and trailers.

The plates have been manufactured by incarcerated workers managed by the Washington State Department of Corrections since 1923. They are primarily produced at the Washington State Penitentiary in Walla Walla, with some also made at the Monroe Correctional Complex in Monroe.

Passenger baseplates

1915 to 1949

1950 to present
The first Washington license plate that complied with these standards was a modification of the 1954 plate, introduced in January 1956.

Non-passenger plates

County coding

Specialty plates

References

External links
Washington license plates, 1969–present

Washington
Transportation in Washington (state)
Washington (state) transportation-related lists